Frambo is a village in the far southeast of Ivory Coast. It is in the sub-prefecture of Tiapoum, Tiapoum Department, Sud-Comoé Region, Comoé District.

Frambo was a commune until March 2012, when it became one of 1126 communes nationwide that were abolished.

Notes

Former communes of Ivory Coast
Populated places in Comoé District
Populated places in Sud-Comoé